Ligo may refer to:

 LIGO, physics experiment
 LIGO (film), a 2019 American documentary film
 Līgo Parish, Latvia
 James Ligo (died December 2017), Anglican bishop
 Līgo, a Latvian holiday

See also
 Ligo Ligo (disambiguation)
 
 Lego (disambiguation)